Mash, MASH, or M*A*S*H may refer to:
 Mobile Army Surgical Hospital, a United States Army medical unit

Arts, entertainment, and media
 M*A*S*H, an American media franchise
 MASH: A Novel About Three Army Doctors, a 1968 novel by Richard Hooker
 M*A*S*H (film), a 1970 American satirical black comedy war film
 M*A*S*H (TV series) (1972–1983), an American television series developed by Larry Gelbart, based on the film
 List of M*A*S*H novels

Foods and beverages
 Mashing, process of combining a mix of grains with water and then heating the mixture.
Mash ingredients, ingredients used to produce a mash for the production of alcoholic beverages
 Mashed potato (English colloquialism: mash)

People
 Deborah Mash, American professor of neurology, and molecular and cellular pharmacology
 Lloyd Mash (born 1981), Australian first-class cricketer
 Matt Mervis, nicknamed Mash (born 1998), American baseball player
 Mashrafe Mortaza, known as Mash, Bangladeshi international cricketer and politician

Mathematics and technology
 MASH (modulator) (multi-stage noise shaping structure), a variation of delta-sigma modulation
 MASH-1 and MASH-2, a hash function based on modular arithmetic
 Yahoo! Mash, a social network service

Other uses
 Mash (biblical figure), a minor biblical figure in the book of Genesis
 Mash (online newspaper), a Russian online newspaper
 MASH (game), a two-player paper-and-pencil game
 Mash (restaurant chain), a chain of steakhouses
 Mashramani, abbreviated "Mash", a Guyanese festival

See also

 Mashable, a Scottish-American news website and Internet news blog
 Mashup (disambiguation)
 Mashed (disambiguation)
 Masher (disambiguation)
 Mish Mash (disambiguation)
 Mesh (disambiguation)